Hapalogastridae is a family of decapod crustaceans, belonging to king crabs in the broadest sense, containing the following species:
Acantholithodes Holmes, 1895
Acantholithodes hispidus (Stimpson, 1860)
Dermaturus Brandt, 1850
Dermaturus mandtii Brandt, 1850 — wrinkled crab
Hapalogaster Brandt, 1850
Hapalogaster cavicauda Stimpson, 1859
Hapalogaster dentata (De Haan, 1849)
Hapalogaster grebnitzkii Schalfeew, 1892
Hapalogaster mertensii Brandt, 1850
Oedignathus Benedict, 1895
Oedignathus inermis (Stimpson, 1860) — granular claw crab
Placetron Schalfeew, 1892
Placetron wosnessenskii Schalfeew, 1892 — scaled crab

References

Anomura
Decapod families